Dham  is a village in Kapurthala district of Punjab State, India. The village is administrated by a Sarpanch, who is an elected representative.

Demography 
According to the report published by Census India in 2011, Dham has a total number of 110 houses and population of 592 of which include 309 males and 283 females.  Literacy rate of Dham is 80.34%, higher than state average of 75.84%.  The population of children under the age of 6 years is 58 which is  9.80% of total population of Dham, and child sex ratio is approximately  1000, higher than state average of 846.

Caste  
The village has schedule caste (SC) constitutes 37.33% of total population of the village and it doesn't have any Schedule Tribe (ST) population,

Population data

Air travel connectivity 
The closest airport to the village is Sri Guru Ram Dass Jee International Airport.

Villages in Kapurthala

External links
  Villages in Kapurthala
 Kapurthala Villages List

References

Villages in Kapurthala district